Nandipur Hydropower Plant (NHPP) is a small, low-head, run-of-the-river hydroelectric power generation station of 13.8 megawatt generation capacity (three units of 4.6 MW each), located at Nandipur near Gujranwala, Punjab province of Pakistan, on the flows of Upper Chenab Canal. It is located at 32°90'0N 74°11' 0E. It is a small hydel power generating plant constructed and put in commercial operation in March 1963 with the Average Annual generating capacity of 33.66 million units (GWh) of least expensive electricity.

See also 

 List of dams and reservoirs in Pakistan
 List of power stations in Pakistan
 Khan Khwar Hydropower Project
 Duber Khwar hydropower project

References 

Dams completed in 1963
Energy infrastructure completed in 1963
Dams in Pakistan
Run-of-the-river power stations
Hydroelectric power stations in Pakistan
1963 establishments in Pakistan
Energy in Punjab, Pakistan